Alotau is the capital of Milne Bay Province, in the south-east of Papua New Guinea. It is located on the northern shore of Milne Bay. The town is located within Alotau Urban LLG.

Alotau is also the annual forum for Australian and Papua New Guinean ministers.

Its Cathedral of the Sacred Heart of Jesus is the episcopal see of the Roman Catholic Diocese of Alotau–Sideia.

The town is located within the area in which the invading Japanese army suffered their first land defeat in the Pacific War in 1942, before the Kokoda Track battle. A memorial park at the old battle site commemorates the event. Alotau became the provincial capital in 1969, when it was shifted from Samarai.

Transport 
There is a road from Ulumani to Alotau which passes the local Gurney Airport, named after squadron leader Charles Raymond Gurney of the Royal Australian Air Force, who was killed in the area in 1942. The airport is located 12 km from the town.

Alotau is the gateway to the Milne Bay Province, which contains some of the most remote island communities in the world. Milne Bay is noted for its coral reef and scuba diving experiences.

Climate
Alotau has a tropical rainforest climate (Köppen Af) with heavy rainfall year-round.

See also

References

External links 

 Official Milne Bay Tourism Bureau

Populated places in Milne Bay Province
Provincial capitals in Papua New Guinea